The Lani are an indigenous people in Puncak, Central Papua and Lanny Jaya, Highland Papua, usually labelled 'Western Dani' by foreign missionaries, or grouped—inaccurately—with the Dani people who inhabit the Baliem Valley to the east.

Population
The total population of Lani tribes in the 1980s, as reported by Douglas Hayward in his book The Dani of Irian Jaya, Before and After Conversion was around 200,000 people.

See also

Indigenous people of New Guinea
Forgotten Bird of Paradise

References

Ethnic groups in Indonesia
Indigenous ethnic groups in Western New Guinea